Jacobs Crawley (born May 27, 1988) is an American professional rodeo cowboy who specializes in saddle bronc riding. He won the 2015 Professional Rodeo Cowboys Association (PRCA) Saddle Bronc Riding World Championship.

College career
He won the National Intercollegiate Rodeo Association (NIRA) Saddle Bronc Riding title while at Texas A&M University, where he graduated with an engineering degree.

Semi-professional career
He won the year-end Saddle Bronc Riding championship for the semi-professional Cowboys Professional Rodeo Association (CPRA) in 2008 & 2009.

Professional career
In 2015, he won the PRCA Saddle Bronc Riding World Championship.  In 2016, he finished runner-up by less than $3,000 to Zeke Thurston. His younger brother, Sterling Crawley, is also a PRCA saddle bronc rider, and the two often compete together at the same rodeos.

Personal life
Crawley was born on May 27, 1988, in Ennis, Texas. He spent most of his life in Stephenville, Texas, but now lives in Boerne, Texas.

References

Living people
Saddle bronc riders
People from Stephenville, Texas
People from Boerne, Texas
People from Ennis, Texas
1988 births